The 2017 ASUN men's basketball tournament was the conference postseason tournament for the ASUN Conference. The tournament marked the 38th year the league conducted a postseason tournament. The tournament was held February 27, March 2 and 5, 2017 at campus sites as top seeds host each round. Florida Gulf Coast defeated North Florida, 77–61, in the championship game to receive the conference's  automatic trip to the NCAA tournament.

Seeds
Teams were seeded by record within the conference, with a tiebreaker system to seed teams with identical conference records.

Schedule

Bracket

See also
 2016–17 NCAA Division I men's basketball season
 ASUN men's basketball tournament
 2017 ASUN women's basketball tournament

References

External links 
ASUN Men's Basketball Championship Details

ASUN men's basketball tournament
Tournament
Atlantic Sun men's basketball tournament
Atlantic Sun men's basketball tournament